Gilbert Schaller (born 17 March 1969), is a former professional tennis player from Austria.

Schaller achieved a career-high singles ranking of World No. 17 in 1995. At the 1995 French Open, Schaller upset world No. 2 Pete Sampras in the first round in a five set match.

Schaller won one singles title (in Casablanca) and reached the quarterfinals of the 1996 Hamburg Masters and the 1995 Monte Carlo Masters. He participated in seven Davis Cup ties for Austria from 1993 to 1997, posting a 3–6 record in singles. Schaller resided in Graz when a tour player. From 2007 to 2011, he was Captain of the Austrian Davis Cup-Team and sports director of the ÖTV. Schaller currently works as the sports director in the McCartney Group in Vienna, and as an ATP coach with (Florin Mergea and Marin Draganja).

ATP career finals

Singles: 4 (1 title, 3 runner-ups)

ATP Challenger and ITF Futures finals

Singles: 14 (8–6)

Doubles: 3 (1–2)

Performance timeline

Singles

External links
 
 
 

1969 births
Living people
Austrian male tennis players
Sportspeople from Graz
People from Bruck an der Mur
Sportspeople from Styria
Austrian tennis coaches